"Proud to Fall" is the first single released by Ian McCulloch from his debut solo album Candleland, in 1989. The song reached number one on the Billboard Modern Rock Tracks chart in the US and number fifty-one on the UK Singles Chart.

Track listing
All tracks written by Ian McCulloch except "The Circle Game" by Joni Mitchell.

7-inch single (YZ417)
"Proud to Fall" – 3:57
"Pots of Gold" – 4:20

12-inch single (YZ417T)
"Proud to Fall" (Long Night's Journey Mix) – 7:10
"Pots of Gold" – 4:20
"The Dead End" – 4:45

12-inch single (YZ417TX)
"Proud to Fall" (album version) – 3:57
"Everything Is Real"
"The Circle Game"

Personnel
Ian McCulloch – vocals, guitar, producer ("Everything Is Real", "The Circle Game")
Ray Shulman – bass, keyboards, producer ("Proud to Fall", "Pots of Gold", "The Dead End")
Boris Williams – drums
Gil Norton – remix ("Proud To Fall (Long Night's Journey Mix)")
Henry Priestman – producer ("The Circle Game")

Charts

See also
List of Billboard number-one alternative singles of the 1980s

References

1989 singles
Ian McCulloch (singer) songs
Songs written by Ian McCulloch (singer)
Sire Records singles
1989 songs
Warner Records singles